The Chery E3 (codeproject A19) is a Subcompact sedan produced by Chery before the major facelift and name change to Arrizo 3.

Overview
The Chery E3 was launched on the China car market on September 12, 2013. Prices ranges from 56,800 yuan to 69,800 yuan. 

The Chery E3 was codenamed A19 when under development, and is slotted below Chery E5 and Cowin 3 for the Chery brand and Cowin brand respectively.

The power of the Chery E3 comes from a 1.5 liter Acteco engine developing 109hp (80kW) and 140nm, mated to a five-speed manual transmission. Front suspensions are MacPherson struts and the rear ones are Torsion beams.

References

External links

E3
E3
Subcompact cars
Sedans
Cars introduced in 2013